Baekuni (born 1961), also known as Babe, is an Indonesian serial killer who mutilated and sexually abused 14 young boys.

Life 
The son of a poor farmer in Magelang, Central Java, Baekuni was mocked as a "fool" because he often did not go to class. Unable to bear the insults, he left school permanently and fled to Jakarta. He lived in Banteng Square, until one day he was forcefully sodomized by a thug. This experience influenced his proclivities toward pedophilia and situational necrophilia.

Murders 
In 1993, Baekuni began raping street children between the ages of 4 and 14. He was arrested at his residence at the Gang Haji Dalim Mosque in East Jakarta on January 9, 2010, after a complaint from one of the victims' parents, a 9-year-old victim named Ardiansyah, who disappeared. His mutilated body was found on January 8, 2010, and his head was found a day later.

Trial 
Baekuni was sentenced to life imprisonment on October 6, 2010, by an East Jakarta District Court judge. He appealed to the Jakarta High Court, who then sentenced him to death. His lawyers then appealed the High Court's decision. The Supreme Court rejected Baekuni's appeal and maintained that he was guilty of killing 14 boys and mutilating four of them.

See also 
 List of serial killers by country
 List of serial killers by number of victims
 Very Idham Henyansyah
 Ahmad Suradji

References 

1961 births
Child sexual abuse in Indonesia
Indonesian murderers of children
Indonesian prisoners sentenced to death
Indonesian serial killers
Living people
Male serial killers
Necrophiles
Pedophilia
Prisoners and detainees of Indonesia
Prisoners sentenced to death by Indonesia
Sex crimes
Violence against men in Asia
Indonesian LGBT people